Laumer is a given name and surname. Notable people with the name include:

 Keith Laumer (1925–1993), American science fiction writer
 March Laumer (1923–2000), American writer, brother of March
 Lomer (saint) (died  590), Catholic saint also called "Laumer"